eCOTOOL (e-competences tools) was an international project undertaken through the European Union's Lifelong Learning Programme, specifically the Leonardo da Vinci programme. Having run from 1 June 2009 until 30 November 2011, the eCOTOOL project primarily dealt with initial and continuing vocational education and training (VET) in the European Union. 

The objective of eCOTOOL was to improve the development, exchange, and maintenance of VET certificates and their accessibility and transparency by harmonizing Europass with other European instruments (EQF, ECVET) and e‐competences. This aimed to increase European mobility and the transparency of VET systems. 

eCOTOOL focused on:
 the improvement of the development, exchange, and maintenance of vocational education and training (VET) certificates and their accessibility and transparency and
 increasing European mobility and transparency in general.

In an attempt to achieve these objectives eCOTOOL developed the adaptable Europass CS eco‐tools based on the European policies Europass Certificate Supplement (CS), EQF, ECVET, and PAS 1093. The Europass CS eco‐tools were first tested and evaluated in the agricultural sector. Finally the eCOTOOL results were submitted to the European Standardization Committees (CEN/TC 353) to contribute to a European consensus and standard for VET competences.

Overview 

The overall objective of the eCOTOOL project was to improve the development, exchange, and maintenance of VET certificates and their accessibility and transparency by harmonizing Europass with other European instruments (EQF, ECVET) and e‐competences. This attempted to increase the European mobility and transparency of VET systems through:
 The development of an Application Profile and Technical Tools based on the Europass Certificate Supplement (CS) under the Brand "Europass CS eco‐tools"
 The Adaptation of all Europass CS eco‐tools to the Agricultural Sector and their Pilot Testing and Optimization

The eCOTOOL project attempted to provide advanced and sustainable instruments and tools for the Europass CS.

Project Outcome 

The main benefits of the Europass CS eco‐tools are:
 Better accessibility to existing Europass Certificate Supplements (CS) by ensuring full interoperability amongst any given IT system
 Easier development and maintenance of further Europass Certificate Supplements
 Simple exchange of Europass Certificate Supplements between any online platforms and repositories
 Enhancing European mobility by improving comparisons of VET solutions and their certificates

Brief description of the eCOTOOL products 

First an application profile was developed as an information model from the European instruments to become the European standard for certificate repositories based on the Europass CS specification. This information model was delivered with a full XML binding to complete the Europass CS eco‐tools and to support and facilitate their dissemination to and application in all European countries.

The application profile 
The application profile was disseminated and populated at the website and was freely accessible, applicable and adaptable for all interested European stakeholders. It attempted to facilitate the further development, the maintenance of existing, and the harmonization of all future Europass Certificate Supplements within Europe by this information model which is adaptable and applicable within any branch or sector. The application profile is information model that is needed for the development of the technical tools (WP2). It retains full interoperability with Europass CS and integrate the models and taxonomies of EQF, ECVET and e‐competences.

The technical tools 
The technical tools (XML bindings) attempted to facilitate the exchange of VET certificates between any information systems, databases, online platforms, and repositories for easier and better accessibility, development, and maintenance. The Europass CS Technical Tools are data models as complete XML bindings including a XML Schema Description (XSD) for the implementation within different IT systems and repositories.

The adaptation of the Europass CS eco‐tools to the agricultural sector 
The Europass CS eco‐tools consist of both: the adapted Europass CS application profile
and the adapted Europass CS technical tools in six languages. Freely available on the online platform, the adapted Europass CS eco‐tools attempted to facilitate the implementation, maintenance, exchange, and harmonization of Certificate Supplements within the agricultural sector.

The adaptation of the Europass CS eco‐tools includes the application profile as well as the technical tools by adding and integrating specific requirements of the agricultural sector. That covers agricultural terminology, metadata, and taxonomies as well as methodologies, settings, and didactical principles that are typical for the agricultural sector. The adaptation includes the translations for the user countries of pilot testing.

A summary and comparison of all identified VET requirements and needs is also available as one main input for the adaptation of the Europass CS eco‐tools to the agricultural sector.

The results of the eCOTOOL Project were used by other current European research projects, including the AGRICOM Project and the Compat.egov Project.

See also 
 Lifelong Learning Programme 2007–2013
 Leonardo da Vinci programme

References

External links
eCOTOOL Home Page
eCOTOOL at the ADAM Project Database
University of Duisburg-Essen, Information Systems Department Project Page
Blog entry by Simon Grant from the University of Bolton
QLET (Quality in Learning, Education and Training) Web-platform

Educational policies and initiatives of the European Union
Vocational education in Europe